Robbie Gaffney (born 17 December 1957 in Dublin) is an Irish former footballer.

He signed for Shamrock Rovers under Seán Thomas at the tail end of the 1975/76 season. He made a scoring Rovers debut at Oriel Park in a FAI League Cup tie. He made his League of Ireland debut for Shamrock Rovers at Flower Lodge against Albert Rovers on 5 October 1976. He won the League of Ireland Cup and made 4 appearances in European competition while at Glenmalure Park. He was an unused substitute in the  1978 FAI Cup Final.

In April 1979 Gaffney played for the League of Ireland XI against Italian League B .

On 12 September 1979, he played for Republic of Ireland U21 against Poland.

That season he was the first recipient of the Shamrock Rovers Player of the Year award Shamrock Rovers F.C.#Player of the Year

In May 1980 Gaffney guested for Waterford United on a tour of the US 

He signed for University College Dublin in August 1983 
He won the FAI Cup in a shock win over his previous club in May 1984 and played in the UEFA Cup Winners Cup against Everton. After a spell at Shelbourne he joined Pats in August 1988  He played in both legs of Pats' 1988-89 UEFA Cup ties against Hearts. Under Brian Kerr he won the League Championship in 1990 as well as playing in the following season's European Cup.

At the 2006 Shamrock Rovers Player of the Year award Robbie was inducted into the Rovers Hall of Fame 

A lifelong fan and club member of Shamrock Rovers F.C., he has maintained his ties with the club attending games on a weekly basis.

Honours
League of Ireland: 1
 St Patrick's Athletic 1989/90
FAI Cup: 2
 Shamrock Rovers 1978
 UCD 1984

Sources 

 The Hoops by Paul Doolan and Robert Goggins

Association football midfielders
Shamrock Rovers F.C. players
University College Dublin A.F.C. players
Shelbourne F.C. players
St Patrick's Athletic F.C. players
Kilkenny City A.F.C. players
League of Ireland players
League of Ireland XI players
Republic of Ireland under-21 international footballers
Republic of Ireland association footballers
Association footballers from Dublin (city)
1957 births
Living people